"Tokoloshe Man" was a 1971 UK hit single by John Kongos, released on Fly Records.  It stayed in the UK Singles Chart top 10 for five weeks, peaking at number 4.  Kongos' previous single release was "He's Gonna Step on You Again", another number 4 UK chart hit.

"Tokoloshe Man" was covered by Happy Mondays. It featured on the 1990 Elektra compilation album, Rubáiyát: Elektra's 40th Anniversary.

Meaning
The word Tokoloshe refers to the mystical beast of the same name in African mythology, which is thought to terrorise and eat people at night.

References

1971 singles
Song recordings produced by Gus Dudgeon
John Kongos songs
1971 songs
Songs written by John Kongos
Fly Records singles